American pop rock band Maroon 5 has released seven studio albums, three live albums, two compilation albums, one remix album, six extended plays (EPs), 35 singles, seven promotional singles, and 38 music videos. The group originally formed in 1994 as Kara's Flowers while they were still attending high school. With a line-up of Adam Levine, Jesse Carmichael, Mickey Madden and Ryan Dusick, they released their independent album, We Like Digging? in 1995. In 1997, they signed to Reprise Records and released an album, The Fourth World. After a tepid response to the album, the band parted with their record label and attended college. In 2001, the band regrouped and added James Valentine to the lineup, and pursued a new direction under the name Maroon 5.

Maroon 5 signed with Octone Records and recorded their debut album in 2002. The album Songs About Jane, was released in June 2002 and topped the charts in Australia, France, Ireland, New Zealand, and the United Kingdom. Its lead single "Harder to Breathe" received heavy airplay, which helped propel the album to number 6 on the US Billboard 200. The album's second and third singles, "This Love" and "She Will Be Loved", were worldwide hits in 2004. Five singles were released from the album. For the next few years, the band toured extensively worldwide in support of Songs About Jane and issued two live recordings: 1.22.03.Acoustic (2004) and Live – Friday the 13th (2005).

In 2006, drummer Ryan Dusick departed the band and was replaced by Matt Flynn and the revised band recorded their second album It Won't Be Soon Before Long in early 2007. The album was released in May and peaked at number 1 on the Billboard 200. Four singles were released from the album. The album's first single, "Makes Me Wonder", became the band's first number-one single on the US Billboard Hot 100. Hands All Over, the band's third studio album, was released in September 2010, peaking at number 2 on the Billboard 200. The album's lead single "Misery" was a top 15 hit on the Billboard Hot 100 while the album's fourth single, "Moves Like Jagger", became the band's second single to top the Hot 100. The band released their fourth studio album Overexposed in June 2012. The album peaked at number 2 on the Billboard 200. Its first two singles, "Payphone" and "One More Night", both peaked in the top two of the Billboard Hot 100 and became international hits. The latter single topped the Hot 100, giving the band their third number-one hit on the chart. The album's third single, "Daylight", became a top ten hit in the US and Canada, as well as peaking in the top forty of other multiple countries worldwide.

In September 2014, the fifth studio album V (pronounced: "five"), was released and topped the Billboard 200. The lead single "Maps" marked number six on the Hot 100, the second single "Animals" peaked at number three on the same chart, and the third single "Sugar", number two. In November 2017, the band released their sixth studio album Red Pill Blues and included the top ten singles "Don't Wanna Know" featuring Kendrick Lamar, and "What Lovers Do" featuring SZA. The remix version of "Girls Like You" featuring Cardi B reached number one on the Hot 100, giving the band their fourth number one single in the US.

Albums

Studio albums

Live albums

Compilation albums

Remix albums

Extended plays

Singles

Promotional singles

Other charted songs

Other appearances

Notes

References

External links
 Official website
 Maroon 5 at AllMusic
 
 

Discography
Discographies of American artists
Rock music group discographies
Pop music group discographies